Hernán Williams (born 30 December 1985) is an Argentine cricketer. He played in the 2013 ICC World Cricket League Division Six tournament. He was part of Argentina's squad for the 2007 ICC World Cricket League Division Two tournament in Windhoek, Namibia, where he made his List A debut.

References

External links
 

1985 births
Living people
Argentine cricketers
Cricketers from Buenos Aires